Dirk Orlishausen (born 15 August 1982) is a German retired football goalkeeper, and currently the goalkeeper coach of Hansa Rostock.

Career
He started his senior career at hometown club FSV Sömmerda, where he played until the 2005–06 season before transferring to FC Rot-Weiß Erfurt. After eleven games on the bench, Orlishausen overtook Michael Ratajczak, played in 26 games in his first season and remained the club's first choice keeper until he joined Karlsruhe in the summer of 2011.

Coaching career
In May 2018 Hansa Rostock announced that they had signed Orlishausen for the upcoming season on a 3-year contract. Orlishausen was going to be the goalkeeper coach of the team and also being the third keeper of the squad. He already had the goalkeeping coach license.

References

External links
 

1982 births
Living people
German footballers
FC Rot-Weiß Erfurt players
Karlsruher SC players
FC Hansa Rostock players
2. Bundesliga players
3. Liga players
Association football goalkeepers
FC Hansa Rostock non-playing staff